Danger Stalks Near  A Candle in the Wind is a 1957 Japanese comedy film written and directed by Keisuke Kinoshita.

Plot
Three young hoodlums intend to rob the home of the Satō family which lies isolated in the outskirts of Tokyo. The trio's plan is thwarted by people endlessly going in and out of the house: housewife Yuriko's sister Sakura tries to borrow money after she's heard that Yuriko and her husband Kaneshige have won in the newspaper lottery, the new lodger fights with his predecessor over the vacant room, and, after various other visitors, the mysterious Akama, who pretends to know Kaneshige from student days, shows up. Akama eventually turns out to be a wanted criminal who demands the Satō's savings, arguing that Tetsu, Kaneshige's mother and owner of the house, embezzled Akama's parents during the war. The police arrive in time to arrest Akama, and the three wannabe burglars give up their plan. During the end titles, Kohei, the most reluctant of the trio, can be spotted making a report at the police station.

Cast
 Hideko Takamine as Yuriko Satō
 Keiji Sada as Kaneshige Satō
 Akiko Tamura as Tetsu Satō, Kaneshige's mother
 Toshiko Kobayashi as Sakura, Yuriko's sister
 Kōji Nanbara as Akama

References

External links
 
 

1957 films
1957 comedy films
Japanese comedy films
Japanese black-and-white films
Films directed by Keisuke Kinoshita
1950s Japanese films